Hernán Alejandro Mattiuzzo  (born 28 April 1984 in Buenos Aires) is an Argentine football midfielder who plays for Nueva Chicago in the Primera B Metropolitana.

Club career
Mattiuzzo previously played for San Lorenzo and Nueva Chicago in the Primera Division Argentina. In January 2007, Mattiuzzo suffered a serious knee injury which prevented him from playing for six months.

International career
Mattiuzzo played for the Argentina national football team at the 2001 FIFA U-17 World Championship in Trinidad and Tobago.

References

1984 births
Living people
Footballers from Buenos Aires
Argentine footballers
San Lorenzo de Almagro footballers
Nueva Chicago footballers
Argentine Primera División players
Association football midfielders